San Carlos Apache Airport  is a public use airport located , southeast of the central business district of Globe, a city in Gila County, Arizona, United States. The airport is owned by the San Carlos Apache Tribe. It is included in the National Plan of Integrated Airport Systems for 2011–2015, which categorized it as a general aviation airport.

Facilities and aircraft 
San Carlos Apache Airport covers an area of 185 acres (75 ha) at an elevation of 3,261 feet (994 m) above mean sea level. It has one runway designated 9/27 with an asphalt surface measuring 6,500 by 100 feet (1,981 x 30 m).

For the 12-month period ending April 24, 2011, the airport had 1,900 general aviation aircraft operations, an average of 158 per month. At that time there were four single-engine aircraft based at this airport.

References

External links 
 Aerial image as of April 1992 from USGS The National Map
 
 

Airports in Gila County, Arizona
Native American airports